This is a list of the 189 present and extant earls in the Peerages of England, Scotland, Great Britain, Ireland, and the United Kingdom. Note that it does not include extant earldoms which have become merged (either through marriage or elevation) with marquessates or dukedoms and are today only seen as subsidiary titles. For a more complete list, which adds these "hidden" earldoms as well as extinct, dormant, abeyant, and forfeit ones, see List of earldoms.

Order of precedence 

The general order of precedence among earls is:
 Earls in the Peerage of England
 Earls in the Peerage of Scotland
 Earls in the Peerage of Great Britain
 Earls in the Peerage of Ireland
 Earls in the Peerage of the United Kingdom

Earls in the Peerages of Britain and Ireland

Note: The precedence of the older Scottish earldoms is determined by the Decreet of Ranking of 1606, and not by seniority.

See also
 British nobility
 List of earldoms

References

 
Earldoms
Earldoms
Peerages in the United Kingdom